Steve Moore (born 17 December 1969, Chester) is an English former footballer. He made two professional appearances for his hometown club, Chester City in the 1987–88 season.

As a 17-year-old apprentice Moore was given his first–team debut for Chester (and only league appearance) as a substitute for Barry Butler in a 5–0 defeat at home to Northampton Town on 15 August 1987, the first day two substitutes could be used in The Football League. Three days later Moore wore the number two shirt away at Blackpool in the League Cup despite usually being a forward. He did not make any more appearances at first–team level and drifted into non–league football with Rhyl.

Bibliography

References

1969 births
Living people
English footballers
Sportspeople from Chester
English Football League players
Chester City F.C. players
Rhyl F.C. players
Association football forwards
Association football fullbacks